Bruna Lovisolo (born 6 March 1951) is a former Italian female middle-distance runner and cross-country runner who competed at individual senior level at the World Athletics Cross Country Championships (1973, 1974, 1975).

Biography
Lovisolo won a silver medal with the national team at the 1974 IAAF World Cross Country Championships.

National titles
She won a national championship at individual senior level.
Italian Athletics Championships
3000 m: 1972

See also
 Italian team at the running events

References

External links
 

1951 births
Living people
Italian female middle-distance runners
Italian female cross country runners